Acropora paniculata is a species of acroporid coral that was first described by Addison Emery Verrill in 1902. It is classed as a vulnerable species on the IUCN Red List, and it has a decreasing population. It is uncommon but found over a large area, including in five regions of Indonesia, and is classified under CITES Appendix II.

Description
The branches contain branchlets, which are short. Blue, grey, or cream in colour, the branchlets contain axial, incipient axial, and radial corallites. The incipient axial and axial corallites are tube-shaped, long, and thin, and occur on the tips of the branchlets. It looks similar to Acropora jacquelineae. The mineralised tissue is composed of aragonite (calcium carbonate).

Distribution
Acropora paniculata is found over a large area but is uncommon; the Indo-Pacific, the East China Sea, the western Pacific, the Hawaiian Islands, the central Pacific, the Rodrigues, the Society Islands, the Johnston Atoll, Southeast Asia, Japan, and Eastern Australia. Despite being generally uncommon, it is common in some specific areas such as Papua New Guinea. It occurs in five regions of Indonesia, and at seven locations on the Marshall Islands. The population of the species is known to be decreasing. It is threatened by climate change, coral disease, rising sea temperatures leading to bleaching, reef destruction, being prey to Acanthaster planci, and activity of humans. It is listed as a vulnerable species on the IUCN Red List, is listed CITES Appendix II, and could occur within Marine Protected Areas.

Taxonomy
It was first described by Addison Emery Verrill in 1902 as Acropora paniculata.

References

Acropora
Vulnerable animals
Cnidarians of the Indian Ocean
Cnidarians of the Pacific Ocean
Animals described in 1902
Taxa named by Addison Emery Verrill